Fergus O'Brien (30 March 1930 – 19 October 2016) was an Irish Fine Gael politician who served as Government Chief Whip and Minister of State at the Department of Defence from 1981 to 1982 and 1986 to 1987 and Lord Mayor of Dublin from 1980 to 1981. He served as a Teachta Dála (TD) from 1973 to 1982 and 1982 to 1992.

O'Brien was born in Dublin in 1930. He was educated at the College of Technology, Bolton Street, before becoming involved in politics. O'Brien was elected to Dáil Éireann on his second attempt at the 1973 general election as a Fine Gael TD for the Dublin South-East constituency. After boundary changes, he was re-elected at the 1977 general election for Dublin South-Central and held the seat at the 1981 general election, but was defeated at the February 1982 general election. He was re-elected for Dublin South-Central at the November 1982 general election, and  held the seat until retirement in 1992.

From 1981 to February 1982, O'Brien was Government Chief Whip in Garret FitzGerald's first government. He returned as Chief Whip once again at the end of FitzGerald's second government, serving from 1986 until 1987.

He was Lord Mayor of Dublin from 1980 to 1981.

References

 

1930 births
2016 deaths
Fine Gael TDs
Lord Mayors of Dublin
Members of the 20th Dáil
Members of the 21st Dáil
Members of the 22nd Dáil
Members of the 24th Dáil
Members of the 25th Dáil
Members of the 26th Dáil
Politicians from County Dublin
Ministers of State of the 24th Dáil
Ministers of State of the 22nd Dáil
Alumni of Dublin Institute of Technology
Government Chief Whip (Ireland)